Municipal election for Ghorahi took place on 13 May 2022, with all 97 positions up for election across 19 wards. The electorate elected a mayor, a deputy mayor, 19 ward chairs and 76 ward members. An indirect election will also be held to elect five female members and an additional three female members from the Dalit and minority community to the municipal executive. 

Incumbent Naru Lal Chaudhary from CPN (Unified Marxist–Leninist) was re-elected as mayor.

Background 
Ghorahi was established as a municipality in 1979. The sub-metropolitan city was created in 2017 by merging neighboring Tripur municipality and other village development committees into Ghorahi municipality. The Electors in each ward elect a ward chair and four ward members, out of which two must be female and one of the two must belong to the Dalit community.

In the previous election, Naru Lal Chaudhary of the CPN (Unified Marxist–Leninist) was elected as the first mayor of the sub-metropolitan city.

Candidates

Results

Mayoral election

Ward results 

|-
! colspan="2" style="text-align:centre;" | Party
! Chairman
! Members
|-
| style="background-color:;" |
| style="text-align:left;" |CPN (Unified Marxist-Leninist)
| style="text-align:center;" | 13
| style="text-align:center;" | 52
|-
| style="background-color:;" |
| style="text-align:left;" |Nepali Congress
| style="text-align:center;" | 5
| style="text-align:center;" | 18
|-
| style="background-color:;" |
| style="text-align:left;" |CPN (Maoist Centre)
| style="text-align:center;" | 1
| style="text-align:center;" | 6
|-
! colspan="2" style="text-align:right;" | Total
! 19
! 76
|}

Results by ward

See also 

 2022 Nepalese local elections
 2022 Kathmandu municipal election
 2022 Tulsipur municipal election
 2022 Janakpur municipal election

References

Ghorahi